Ta Kong is a commune (khum) of Malai District in Banteay Meanchey Province in north-western Cambodia.

Villages

References

Communes of Banteay Meanchey province
Malai District